Platensina amplipennis is a species of tephritid or fruit flies in the genus Platensina of the family Tephritidae.

Distribution
India & Taiwan SE to Australia & Solomon Islands, Guam, Micronesia, Northern Mariana Islands.

References

Tephritinae
Insects described in 1860
Diptera of Asia